Crew Dragon Demo-1 (officially Crew Demo-1, SpaceX Demo-1, or Demonstration Mission-1) was the first orbital test of the Dragon 2 spacecraft. This first spaceflight was an uncrewed mission that launched on 2 March 2019  at 07:49:03 UTC, and arrived at the International Space Station on 3 March 2019, a little over 24 hours after the launch. The mission ended following a successful splashdown on 8 March 2019 at 13:45:08 UTC.

During a separate test, on 20 April 2019, the capsule used on Crew Demo-1 was unexpectedly destroyed when firing the SuperDraco engines at Landing Zone 1.

Mission 
The spacecraft tested the approach and automated docking procedures with the International Space Station (ISS), consequent undocking from the ISS, full re-entry, splashdown and recovery steps to provide data requisite to subsequently qualify for flights transporting humans to the ISS. Life support systems were monitored throughout the test flight. The capsule was planned for re-use in an in-flight abort test, but it was destroyed in an accident during a static fire test of its SuperDraco thrusters.

The mission was launched on a SpaceX Falcon 9 Block 5 launch vehicle contracted by NASA's Commercial Crew Program. Initial plans had hoped to see CCDev2 flights as early as 2015. Demo-1 was eventually slated for no earlier than December 2016, and then delayed several times throughout 2017. The first exact date was published by NASA in November 2018 to be 17 January 2019, but this was delayed until February 2019. The static fire took place on 24 January 2019 and the launch date was set to 23 February 2019. By the end of January 2019, the launch was delayed to no earlier than 2 March 2019 according to a FCC filing by SpaceX for Dragon 2 capsule telemetry, tracking, and command. 

Demo-1 passed its Flight Readiness Review (FRR) and Launch Readiness Review (LRR) on 22 February 2019 and 27 February 2019 respectively.

The Falcon 9 with Demo-1 rolled out to the LC-39A on 28 February 2019 at around 15:00 UTC and went vertical a few hours later. The spacecraft was launched on 2 March 2019 at 07:49:03 UTC and successfully docked to the ISS on 3 March 2019 at 10:51 UTC.

The Dragon 2 spacecraft successfully undocked from the ISS on 8 March 2019 at 07:32 UTC. The capsule was recovered using SpaceX's recovery ship GO Searcher and was returned to the mainland where it was examined and the data collected by the on board sensors was analyzed.

Payload 
Instead of carrying astronauts to the ISS, this flight had an Anthropomorphic Test Device (ATD) wearing SpaceX's custom flight suit. The ATD is named Ripley, as a homage to Sigourney Weaver's character in the Alien movies franchise. The "zero-g indicator" was left on board the ISS after undocking, while Ripley returned safely to Earth on 8 March 2019.

Gallery

See also 

 Boeing Starliner
 Boeing Orbital Flight Test
 Boeing Orbital Flight Test 2

Notes

References

External links 

 Crew Demo-1 Mission press kit (Archived 2 March 2019)

 Dragon at SpaceX (Archived 2 March 2019)

SpaceX Dragon 2
SpaceX payloads contracted by NASA
Supply vehicles for the International Space Station
Spacecraft launched in 2019
Spacecraft which reentered in 2019
Test spaceflights